Łukasz Niedziałek (born 15 March 2000) is a Polish racewalking athlete. He qualified to represent Poland at the 2020 Summer Olympics in Tokyo 2021, competing in men's 20 kilometres walk.

References

External links
 

 

2000 births
Living people
Polish male racewalkers
Athletes (track and field) at the 2020 Summer Olympics
Olympic athletes of Poland